Rangooniha Mosque is related to the Qajar dynasty-Pahlavi dynasty and is located in Khuzestan Province, Abadan County.

References

Mosques in Iran
Mosque buildings with domes
National works of Iran
Buildings of the Qajar period
Buildings and structures in Khuzestan Province
Abadan County
Khuzestan Province articles missing geocoordinate data